The Africa Alphabet (also International African Alphabet or IAI alphabet) was developed by the  International Institute of African Languages and Cultures in 1928, with the help of some Africans led by Diedrich Hermann Westermann, who served as director of the organization from 1926 until 1939. Meanwhile, the aim of the International Institute of African Languages and Cultures, later known as International African Institute (IAI), was to enable people to write all the African languages for practical and scientific purposes without the need of diacritics. It is based on the International Phonetic Alphabet with a few differences, such as j (IPA ) and y (IPA ), which represent the same (consonant) sound values as in English.

This alphabet has influenced development of orthographies of many African languages (serving "as the basis for the transcription" of about 60, by one count), but not all, and discussions of harmonization of systems of transcription that led to, among other things, adoption of the African reference alphabet.

The African Alphabet was used, with the International Phonetic Alphabet, as a basis for the World Orthography. Some of those IPA letters as Ɔ have been introduced in orthographies of several African languages, sometimes those languages read as IPA.

Characters

See also
African reference alphabet
Latin-script alphabet
Dinka alphabet
ISO 6438
Pan-Nigerian alphabet
Standard Alphabet by Lepsius

Notes

References
Coulmas, Florian, The Blackwell Encyclopedia of Writing Systems, 1996, Blackwell, Oxford
IIACL, Practical Orthography of African Languages, Revised Edition, London: Oxford University Press, 1930
Sow, Alfa I., and Mohamed H. Abdulaziz, "Language and Social Change," Ch. 18 in Ali A. Mazrui (ed.) Africa Since 1935 (UNESCO General History of Africa, Vol. 8). University of California Press, 1993.

Latin alphabets
Writing systems of Africa
Writing systems introduced in 1928
Orthography